The Battle of Chapultepec was a battle between American forces and Mexican forces holding the strategically located Chapultepec Castle just outside Mexico City, fought 13 September 1847 during the Mexican–American War. The building, sitting atop a  hill, was an important position for the defense of the city.

The battle was part of the campaign to take Mexico City, for which General Winfield Scott's U.S. Army totaled 7,200 men. General Antonio López de Santa Anna, commander of the Mexican army, had formed an army of approximately 25,000 men. Mexican forces, including military cadets of the Military Academy, defended the position at Chapultepec against 2,000 U.S. forces. The Mexicans' loss opened the way for the Americans to take the center of Mexico City.

In Mexican history, the battle is cast as the story of the brave deaths of six cadets, the Niños Héroes, who leapt to their deaths rather than be taken captive, with one wrapping himself in the Mexican flag. American sources also feature many depictions of the battle from the American point of view. Although it lasted only about 60–90 minutes, the battle has great importance in the histories of both countries.

Scott's campaign to take Mexico City

Scott had taken a risk by marching inland from the port of Veracruz, going beyond his supply lines.  He fought a major battle at Cerro Gordo, but encountered virtually no resistance in capturing Mexico's second-largest city, Puebla. He then pushed further toward the capital. Scott avoided the direct route from Puebla to Mexico City because the road was heavily defended at El Peñon. Instead, he cut a road looping south of Lake Chalco and Lake Xochimilco to the town of San Agustín. The Mexican defenders blocked the route to the capital at Hacienda of San Antonio, with marshes to their north and a lava field to the south, known as the Pedregal. General Gideon Johnson Pillow's division cut a road for artillery through the Pedregal to engage the entrenched Mexican forces under General Gabriel Valencia at Contreras on 20 August. The Mexicans were routed and the U.S. forces pressed on.  Santa Anna fortified the ex-convent at Churubusco, with fierce fighting there. A 2-week armistice followed the battle.

On September 8, 1847, in the costly Battle of Molino del Rey, U.S. forces had managed to drive the Mexicans from their positions near the base of Chapultepec Castle guarding Mexico City from the west, but Army engineers were still interested in the southern causeways to the city. General Scott held a council of war with his generals and engineers on September 11.  Scott was in favor of attacking Chapultepec, and only General David E. Twiggs agreed. Most of Scott's officers favored the attack through the southern gates, including Captain Robert E. Lee. A young lieutenant, P. G. T. Beauregard, gave a speech that persuaded General Franklin Pierce to change his vote in favor of the western attack. Given that Mexican forces defended fortified positions tenaciously and had inflicted severe casualties on U.S. forces at Molino del Rey and Cerro Gordo, the decision to attack Chapultepec was not taken lightly.

Battle

General Lopez de Santa Anna was in command of the army at Mexico City, and understood that Chapultepec Castle was an important position for the defense of the city. The castle sat atop a 200-ft-tall hill, which was used as the Mexican Military Academy. Although Santa Anna's total forces defending Mexico City were larger than Scott's, he had to defend multiple positions, since he did not know from where the attack would come. He did not have enough troops to effectively defend both the southern causeways into Mexico City and Chapultepec Castle, at a distance from the capital. At Chapultepec, General Nicolás Bravo had fewer than 1,000 men (832 total including 250 from the 10th Infantry, 115 from the Querétaro Battalion, 277 from the Mina Battalion, 211 from the Union Battalion, 27 from the Toluca Battalion and 42 from the Patria Battalion) and only seven guns (Gen. Manuel Gamboa with two 24-lb, one 8-lb, three 4-lb. and one howitzer) to hold the hill. These forces also included about 200 cadets, some as young as 13 years old. Also defending the castle was the Batallón de San Blas under the command of Lieutenant Colonel Felipe Xicoténcatl, a hero of the battle, along with six cadets who died defending the castle.  Thinking that the attack would come from the south, Santa Anna devoted preparation time and troops there, both before and during the bombardment. He did not realize his mistake until the U.S. troops were actually on the hill, but that was too late.

Chapultepec Castle was not built as a fortress but as a luxury residence, later converted to the military academy. It was obviously strategically positioned, but its stone walls were vulnerable to cannon fire. U.S. forces used its heavy artillery to bombard the castle before the infantry attack. The Mexican forces had attempted to fortify the defenses by digging shallow trenches and placing sandbags. During the artillery bombardment,  the defenders had nowhere to shelter and they had no way to defend against this attack from a distance. Destruction of the walls, sandbags, and other defenses was demoralizing for many defenders, and some began abandoning their positions. Only when the bombardment went on all day did Santa Anna realize the main attack was to be on Chapultepec. If he sent forces there, they would be exposed to U.S. fire in the flat land below the hill, and they could not reach the hill to help the defenders there during the bombardment. Santa Anna consulted with Nicolás Bravo, confessing to him that many of his demoralized troops were also likely to melt away if sent into a situation that would have high casualties.

Scott organized two storming parties of about 250 men each, including 40 Marines. The first party consisted of Captain Samuel Mackenzie's 256 men from Gideon Pillow's division, who would advance from the Molino east up the hill. The second storming party consisted of Captain Silas Casey's men from John A. Quitman's division, advancing along the Tacubaya Road, but Casey was replaced by Major Levi Twiggs. Only Twiggs' division and Bennett Riley's brigade were left on the American right flank.

The U.S. forces began an artillery barrage against Chapultepec at dawn on September 12. It was halted at dark and resumed at first light on September 13. At 8:00 am, the bombardment was halted and General Scott ordered the infantry attack. Three assault columns formed. On the left were the 11th and 14th Infantry under Colonel William Trousdale moving east along the Anzures aqueduct, in the center were four companies of the Voltigeur regiment under Colonel Timothy Patrick Andrews along with the 9th under Colonel Truman Bishop Ransom and the 15th Infantry all moving through the swamp and western edge of the grove, and on the right were the remaining four Voltigeur companies under Lieutenant Colonel Joseph E. Johnston.

Pillow was quickly hit in the foot and called for reinforcements, which came from John A. Quitman's division, but the attack faltered when fired upon by the Moelia Battalion battery. Andrews's column cleared the grove of Mexican troops and linked up with Johnston. The attack by the 9th and 15th Infantries stalled waiting for scaling ladders, and Col. Truman B. Ransom, commander of the 9th Infantry, was killed.

Quitman sent Persifor Smith's brigade to his right and brought in James Shields, plus the New York and 2d Pennsylvania Regiments into the assault. At the same time, Newman S. Clarke's brigade arrived on the western slope, as did the scaling ladders.  The Voltigeurs soon planted their flag on the parapet.

By 9:00 am, General Bravo surrendered to the New York Regiment, and the American flag flew over the castle.  Santa Anna watched the Americans take Chapultepec, while an aide exclaimed, "let the Mexican flag never be touched by a foreign enemy".  He also exclaimed, "I believe if we were to plant our batteries in Hell, the damned Yankees would take them from us."

Los Niños Héroes

During the battle, five Mexican military cadets, and one of their instructors, refused to fall back when General Bravo finally ordered retreat, and fought to the death. These were teniente (lieutenant) Juan de la Barrera and cadets Agustín Melgar, Juan Escutia, Vicente Suárez, Francisco Márquez, and Fernando Montes de Oca, all between the ages of 13 and 19. According to legend, the last of the six, Juan Escutia,  grabbed the Mexican flag, wrapped it around himself, and jumped off the castle point to prevent the flag from falling into enemy hands. In 1967, Gabriel Flores painted a mural depicting Los Niños Héroes. The mural decorates the ceiling of the palace, showing Escutia wrapped in the flag, apparently falling from above. A monument stands in Chapultepec Park commemorating their courage. The cadets are eulogized in Mexican history as los Niños Héroes, the Child Heroes or Heroic Cadets.

Saint Patrick's Battalion

Thirty men from the Saint Patrick's Battalion, a group of former United States Army soldiers who joined the Mexican side, were executed en masse during the battle. They had been previously captured at the Battle of Churubusco. Colonel William S. Harney specified that they were to be hanged with Chapultepec in view and that the precise moment of their death was to occur when the U.S. flag replaced the Mexican tricolor atop the citadel.

Battles for the Belén and San Cosmé Gates
General Scott arrived at the castle and was mobbed by cheering soldiers.
William J. Worth's division was sent by Scott to support Trousdale's men on La Verónica Causeway (now Avenida Melchor Ocampo) for the main attack against the San Cosme Gate.   Defended by Gen. Rangel's Granaderos Battalion, part Matamoros, Morelia, and Santa Anna Battalions (Col. Gonzalez), part 3d Light (Lt. Col. Echeagaray),  & 1st Light (Comdt. Marquez)  Trousdale, followed by John Garland, Newman Clarke, and George Cadwalader's brigades, began advancing up the causeway.

General Quitman quickly gathered the troops in Chapultepec, except the 15th Infantry, who guarded the castle and prisoners, and designed as a feint, headed down the Belén Causeway, stopping at the Belen Garita.  The gate was manned by the Morelia Battalion, under the command of General Andrés Terrés' (three guns and 180 men: 2d Mexico Activos) and the paseo to the north by General Ramirez.  Troops began to desert, and when Terres ran out of ammunition, he withdrew into the Ciudadela.   Led by the Mounted Rifles (fighting on foot), Quitman breached the Belén Gate at 1:20 pm.   General Scott later commented, "Brave Rifles, you have gone through fire and come out steel".

Worth started his advance down the San Cosme causeway at 4:00 pm, having fended off an attack by 1,500 of Torrejon's cavalry. Garland's brigade used the arches of the aqueduct to advance on the right. Clarke's men on the right passed through a tunnel made by sappers.  Lieutenant Ulysses S. Grant, and some 4th Infantry used the bell tower of San Cosme Church south of the causeway to place a mountain howitzer.  On the north side of the road, naval officer Raphael Semmes repeated Grant's successful maneuver.  Lt. George Terrett then led a group of U.S. Marines behind the Mexican defenders, and climbing to the roof, unleashed a deadly volley on the artillery gunners.  By 6 pm, Worth had broken through the gate, and the defenders scattered, many retreating into the Ciudadela, sweeping Santa Anna along with them.   As night fell, Worth lobbed five mortar rounds into the city, which fell near the National Palace.

Aftermath
The city was yet to be taken, Santa Anna had 5,000 troops in the Ciudadela (armory) and 7,000 in other parts of the city.  Six of his generals were taken prisoner.  At 1 AM the next day, he ordered a withdrawal to Guadalupe Hidalgo while the city authorities appeared at Scott's headquarters at 4 AM.  By 7 am, the American flag was flying over the Ciudadela. Historian K. Jack Bauer gives the Mexican casualties as approximately 3,000; including 823 taken prisoner.

Legacies

The efforts of the U.S. Marines in this battle and subsequent occupation of Mexico City are memorialized by the opening lines of the "Marines' Hymn", "From the Halls of Montezuma...".

A number of lower-ranking U.S. Army officers participating in the invasion became generals on both sides of the American Civil War, including Daniel H. Hill, Ulysses Grant, George Pickett, James Longstreet, John C. Pemberton, Thomas Jonathan "Stonewall" Jackson, P. G. T. Beauregard, and Robert E. Lee.

U.S. Marine tradition maintains that the red stripe is worn on the trousers of the blue dress uniform, commonly known as the blood stripe, because a large number of the Marine NCOs and officers of the detachment died while storming the castle of Chapultepec in 1847, though iterations of the stripe antedate the war. In 1849, the stripes were changed to a solid red from dark blue stripes edged in red, which dated from 1839.

In Mexico, the battle has a complicated place in historical memory, since the capture of Chapultepec led to the fall of Mexico City to the invaders. The fierce defense of Chapultepec by military cadets at the Military Academy, six of whom died by leaping from the walls to their deaths. The Niños Héroes ("Boy Heroes") were considered martyrs fighting to maintain Mexico's honor as a nation. Their bravery and innocence was lauded in Mexico, as opposed to the Mexican Army generals, particularly Antonio López de Santa Anna, blamed for Mexico's defeat.

In 1947, President Harry S. Truman laid a wreath on the 1881 cenotaph of the Niños Héroes as a gesture of goodwill after Mexico aided the U.S. in World War II.

Gallery

References

Further reading
 Alcaraz, Ramon et al. Apuntes Para la Historia de la Guerra entre Mexico y los Estados Unidos
 Eisenhower, John S. D.,  Agent of Destiny – The Life and Times of General Winfield Scott
 Kendall, George Wilkins. The War Between the United States and Mexico Illustrated. New York: D. Appleton & Co. 1851.
 Ramsey, Albert C. The Other Side
 Sandweiss, Martha A., Rick Stewart, and Ben W. Huseman. Eyewitness to War: Prints and Daguerreotypes of the Mexican War, 1846-1848. Fort Worth: Amon Carter Museum of Western Art, 1989.
 Annual Reports 1894, War Department lists trophy guns: 1- 24pounder bronze, 1- 8 inch howitzer and 2- 4-pounder bonze howitzers.

External links
 A Continent Divided: The U.S. – Mexico War, Center for Greater Southwestern Studies and UTA Libraries Special Collections, the University of Texas at Arlington
 Scott, Winfield. Official Report

1847 in Mexico
Mexican–American War forts
Battles of the Texas Ranger Division
History of Mexico City
Mexico City Campaign
United States Marine Corps in the 18th and 19th centuries
United States Marine Corps lore and symbols
Chapultepec
19th century in Mexico City
September 1847 events